Apolipoprotein C-II (Apo-CII, or Apoc-II), or apolipoprotein C2 is a protein that in humans is encoded by the  gene.

The protein encoded by this gene is secreted in plasma where it is a component of very low density lipoproteins and chylomicrons. This protein activates the enzyme lipoprotein lipase in capillaries, which hydrolyzes triglycerides and thus provides free fatty acids for cells. Mutations in this gene cause hyperlipoproteinemia type IB, characterized by xanthomas, pancreatitis, and hepatosplenomegaly, but no increased risk for atherosclerosis. Lab tests will show elevated blood levels of triglycerides, cholesterol, and chylomicrons

Interactive pathway map

See also 
 Apolipoprotein C

References

External links
 

Apolipoproteins